Ideologi Sikap Otak is a studio album by Ahmad Band  and was released in 1998 in Indonesia. The title translates into "The Ideology of Brain Attitude". The album is considered Dewa 19 frontman Ahmad Dhani's solo project. The entire album was written by Dhani with the exception of one track, "Aku Cinta Kau dan Dia", which was co-written with Bebi.

In the same year, the music video for the single "Distorsi" was nominated for a national video award, achieving the runner-up position.

In 1999, Dhani with Dewa 19 and Ahmad Band guitarist Andra Ramadhan (professionally known as Andra or Andra R.) released a song for the film Kuldesak. The track was released as a CD single and become a massive hit in Indonesia anad won the MTV Southeast Asia Viewer's Choice Award 2000.

Track listing
All songs written by Ahmad Dhani, except "Aku Cinta Kau Dan Dia" by Dhani and Bebi.

Personnel 
 Ahmad Dhani – lead vocals, rhythm guitar, keyboards
 Andra Ramadhan – guitar
 Pay Burman – guitar
 Bongky Marcel – bass
 Bimo Sulaksono – drums

Additional Player
 Bagus Netral – voice on "Maklumat"
 Didi Gimbal – bass on "Impotent", "Interupsi", "Maklumat"
 Fika – voice on "Bidadari di Kesunyian"
 Once Mekel – voice on "Bidadari di Kesunyian"
 Tere – voice on "Gairah Tak Biasa"
 Maia Estianty – voice on "Sudah"
 Bebi Romeo – voice on "Dunia Lelaki", "Aku Cinta Kau dan Dia"
 Hendri Lamiri – biola on "Sudah"

1998 albums